Myrmosa atra is a Palearctic species of myrmosid, a cleptoparasite in fossorial bee nests.

References

External links
Images representing  Myrmosa atra 

Hymenoptera of Europe
Myrmosidae
Insects described in 1801